Bobby Austin (May 5, 1933 in Wenatchee, Washington – January 6, 2002 in Camas, Washington) was an American country musician.

Austin moved to Los Angeles in 1955, where he played bass in Wynn Stewart's band. He also worked as a session musician, for Buck Owens and Tommy Collins, among others, before being signed by Capitol Records as a solo artist in 1962. His "Apartment No. 9", written with Johnny Paycheck, was a hit for Tammy Wynette, in addition to reaching No. 21 on the U.S. country charts with his own version. He also co-wrote "Try a Little Kindness" which became a hit for Glen Campbell.

Discography
Apartment No. 9 (Capitol Records, 1967) U.S. Country No. 11
Old Love Never Dies (Capitol, 1968)

Singles

References

External links
 

1933 births
2002 deaths
American session musicians
American country singer-songwriters
Challenge Records artists
People from Wenatchee, Washington
Country musicians from Washington (state)
20th-century American singers
Singer-songwriters from Washington (state)
Challenge Records (1950s) artists